The Senate Centrist Coalition was a bipartisan caucus of moderate United States Senators. Founded by John Breaux (D-LA) and Lincoln Chafee (R-RI) in 1994, the group had 33 members by 2002. It sought bipartisan agreements on issues such as a balanced budget, welfare reform, and healthcare reform.

Coalition Members (109th Congress)
 Evan Bayh (D-IN)
 Tom Carper (D-DE)
 Susan Collins (R-ME)
 Kent Conrad (D-ND)
 Dianne Feinstein (D-CA)
 Judd Gregg (R-NH)
 Herb Kohl (D-WI)
 Mary Landrieu (D-LA)
 Joseph Lieberman (I-CT)
 Blanche Lincoln (D-AR)
 John McCain (R-AZ)
 Ben Nelson (D-NE)
 Bill Nelson (D-FL)
 Mark Pryor (D-AR)
 Richard Shelby (R-AL)
 Olympia Snowe (R-ME)
 George Voinovich (R-OH)

See also
 New Democrats
 Third Way

References

Centrist political advocacy groups in the United States
Defunct political advocacy groups in the United States
United States Senate